Environmental Science & Technology is a biweekly peer-reviewed scientific journal published since 1967 by the American Chemical Society. It covers research in environmental science and environmental technology, including environmental policy. Environmental Science & Technology has a sister journal, Environmental Science & Technology Letters, which publishes short communications.

The editor-in-chief of Environmental Science & Technology is Prof. Julie Zimmerman (Yale University).  Previous editors have been: David Sedlak (University of California, Berkeley, 2014 - 2020), James J. Morgan (California Institute of Technology; founding editor, 1967-1975), Russell F. Christman (University of North Carolina, 1975-1987), William H. Glaze (University of North Carolina, 1987-2003) and Jerald L. Schnoor (University of Iowa, 2002-2014).

Abstracting and indexing
According to the Journal Citation Reports, the journal has a 2021 impact factor of 11.357. The journal is abstracted and indexed in:
Chemical Abstracts Service
Current Contents/Physical, Chemical & Earth Sciences
Ei Compendex
Science Citation Index Expanded
Scopus

See also 
Environmental Science & Technology Letters

References

External links 
 

American Chemical Society academic journals
Environmental science journals
Environmental social science journals
Biweekly journals
Publications established in 1967
English-language journals